Scharfenberger is a surname. Notable people with the surname include:

Edward Bernard Scharfenberger (born 1948), American Roman Catholic bishop
Gerard Scharfenberger (born 1958), American politician